The 1960 Harelbeke–Antwerp–Harelbeke was the third edition of the E3 Harelbeke cycle race and was held on 12 March 1960. The race started and finished in Harelbeke. The race was won by Daniel Doom.

General classification

Notes

References

1960 in Belgian sport
1960
1960 in road cycling
March 1960 sports events in Europe